Unsere Schtimme ('Our Voice') was a Bundist daily Yiddish-language newspaper published from Paris. In the early 1960s, it had a circulation of around 3,000. Editors included Jacob Gros, Leon Stern and Abraham Shulman.

References

Anti-Zionism in France
Ashkenazi Jewish culture in Paris
Bundism in Europe
Defunct newspapers published in France
Jews and Judaism in Paris
Newspapers published in Paris
Secular Jewish culture in France
Yiddish periodicals
Yiddish culture in France
Publications with year of disestablishment missing
Publications with year of establishment missing
Daily newspapers published in France